Ji'an (formerly ) is a county-level city in the southwestern part of Jilin province, People's Republic of China. It is administered by the prefecture-level city of Tonghua and is the southernmost county-level division in the province. The city was given its current status in 1988. Ji'an is separated from Manpo, Chagang Province, North Korea by the Yalu River; it has an international border running .

History

Archaeological excavations in the Ji'an area have unearthed several Yemaek sites along the Amnok River and its tributary the Hunjiang, which belong to the regional Neolithic and Bronze ages.

After the fall of Wiman Joseon to the Han dynasty in 108 BCE, Ji'an was part of Goguryeo County under the administration of Xuantu Commandery. In 3 CE, the second ruler of Goguryeo, King Yuri, moved the state's capital to Gungnae (modern Ji'an) and established the mountain fortress Hwando nearby to defend it. Hwando was sacked by Wei State in 244 CE during the Goguryeo–Wei War. In 342 CE, Hwando was destroyed and thousands of people captured by the Murong Xianbei, after which Goguryeo focussed on expanding south and east. In 427 CE, the eleventh ruler of Goguryeo, King Jangsu, moved the capital to Pyongyang, which saw Gungnae relegated to subsidiary capital status.

The Capital Cities and Tombs of the Ancient Koguryo Kingdom, located in Ji'an and Huanren Manchu Autonomous County, Liaoning, have been listed as part of a UNESCO World Heritage Site. Ji'an is also dubbed as a "Little Jiangnan" of Jilin due to its scenery.

Geography and climate
Ji'an has a monsoon-influenced humid continental climate (Köppen Dwa), with long, very cold winters, and very warm, humid summers. The frost-free period lasts around 150 days.

Gallery

Administrative divisions
Subdistricts:

Tuanjie Subdistrict, Liming Subdistrict, Chengdong Subdistrict, Tongsheng Subdistrict

Towns:
Qingshi, Qinghe, Toudao, Huadian, Yulin, Taishang, Caiyuan, Yangcha, Dalu, Renao

Townships:
Taiwang Township, Maxian Township, Huangbai Township, Taiping Township, Tonggou Township, Shuangcha Township, Guoshuchang Township, Liangshui Korean Ethnic Township

References

External links

Ji'an Government

 
Cities in Jilin
China–North Korea border crossings